Rory Kohlert (born January 7, 1988) is a retired professional Canadian football wide receiver who played for six seasons in the Canadian Football League (CFL). He was originally signed as an undrafted free agent by the Hamilton Tiger-Cats on March 2, 2011, and was released on July 25, 2011. After returning to the Huskies in 2011, Kohlert signed with the Blue Bombers on March 23, 2012. On December 16, 2013, Kohlert was drafted by the Ottawa Redblacks in the 2013 CFL Expansion Draft, but re-signed with Winnipeg on February 11, 2014 after he became a free agent. After two seasons with the Blue Bombers, Kohlert signed a contract with the Calgary Stampeders for the 2017 season.  He played CIS football with the Saskatchewan Huskies.

References

External links
Winnipeg Blue Bombers bio 

1988 births
Living people
Players of Canadian football from Saskatchewan
Canadian football wide receivers
Hamilton Tiger-Cats players
Ottawa Redblacks players
Sportspeople from Regina, Saskatchewan
Saskatchewan Huskies football players
Winnipeg Blue Bombers players
Calgary Stampeders players
Edmonton Elks players